Dismemberment is the act of cutting, ripping, tearing, pulling, wrenching or otherwise disconnecting the limbs from a living or dead being. It has been practiced upon human beings as a form of capital punishment, especially in connection with regicide, but can occur as a result of a traumatic accident, or in connection with murder, suicide, or cannibalism. As opposed to surgical amputation of the limbs, dismemberment is often fatal. In criminology, a distinction is made between offensive dismemberment, in which dismemberment is the primary objective of the dismemberer, and defensive dismemberment, in which the motivation is to destroy evidence. 

In 2019, Michael H. Stone, Gary Brucato and Ann Burgess proposed formal criteria by which "dismemberment" might be systematically distinguished from the act of "mutilation", as these terms are commonly used interchangeably. They suggested that dismemberment involves "the entire removal, by any means, of a large section of the body of a living or dead person, specifically, the head (also termed decapitation), arms, hands, torso, pelvic area, legs, or feet". Mutilation, by contrast, involves "the removal or irreparable disfigurement, by any means, of some smaller portion of one of those larger sections of a living or dead person. The latter would include castration (removal of the testes), evisceration (removal of the internal organs), and flaying (removal of the skin)." According to these parameters, removing a whole hand would constitute dismemberment, while removing or damaging a finger would be mutilation; decapitation of a full head would be dismemberment, while removing or damaging a part of the face would be mutilation; and removing a whole torso would be dismemberment, while removing or damaging a breast or the organs contained within the torso would be mutilation.

History

Cutting apart

Slicing to pieces by elephant
Particularly in South-Eastern Asia, execution by trained elephants was a form of capital punishment practiced for several centuries. The techniques by which the convicted person was executed varied widely but did, on occasion, include the elephant dismembering the victim by means of sharp blades attached to its feet. The Muslim traveller Ibn Battuta, visiting Delhi in the 1330s, has left the following eyewitness account of this particular type of execution by elephants:

Quartering procedure in the Holy Roman Empire

In the Holy Roman Empire emperor Charles V's 1532 Constitutio Criminalis Carolina specifies how every dismemberment (quartering) should ideally occur:

Thus, the imperially approved way to dismember the convict within the Holy Roman Empire was by means of cutting, rather than dismemberment through ripping the individual apart. In paragraph 124 of the same code, beheading prior to quartering is mentioned as allowable when extenuating circumstances are present, whereas aggravating circumstances may allow pinching/ripping the criminal with glowing pincers, prior to quartering.

The fate of Wilhelm von Grumbach in 1567, a maverick knight in the Holy Roman Empire who was fond of making his own private wars and was thus condemned for treason, is also worthy of note. Gout-ridden, he was carried to the execution site in a chair and bound fast to a table. The executioner then ripped out his heart, and stuck it in von Grumbach's face with the words: "von Grumbach! Behold your false heart!" Afterwards, the executioner quartered von Grumbach's body. His principal associate was given the same treatment, and an eyewitness stated that after his heart had been ripped out, Chancellor Brück screamed horribly for "quite some time".

One example of a highly aggravated execution is illustrated by the fate of Bastian Karnhars on 16 July 1600. Karnhars was found guilty of 52 separate acts of murder, including the rape and murder of 8 women, and the murder of a child, whose heart he had allegedly eaten for rituals of black magic. To begin, Karnhars had three strips of flesh torn from his back, before being pinched 18 times with glowing pincers, having his fingers clipped off one by one, his arms and legs broken on the wheel, and finally, while still alive, quartered.

Fabled Turkish execution method
In the seventeenth century, a number of travel reports speak of an exotic "Turkish" execution method, where first the waist of a man was constricted by ropes and cords, and then a swift bisection of the trunk was performed. William Lithgow presents a comparatively prosaic description of the method:

George Sandys, however, during the same period, tells of a method as no longer in use, in a rather more mythologized way:

Shekkeh in Persia
In 1850s Persia, a particular dismemberment technique called shekkeh is reported to have been used. Travelling as an official for the East India Company Robert Binning describes it as follows:

Mughal Empire 
Sikh martyr Bhai Mani Singh was dismembered on the orders of Zakaria Khan, the Mughal Subahdar of Lahore after failing to pay tribute and refusing to convert to Islam.

Korea
Dismemberment was a form of capital punishment for convicts of high treason in the Korean kingdom of the Joseon Dynasty. This punishment was, for example, meted out to Hwang Sa-Yong in 1801.

China
The Five Pains is a Chinese variation invented during the Qin dynasty. During the Tang dynasty (AD 618–907), truncation of the body at the waist by means of a fodder knife was a death penalty reserved for those who were seen to have done something particularly treacherous or repugnant. That practice of cutting in two did not originate in the Tang dynasty; in sources concerning the Han dynasty (206 BC – AD 220), no fewer than 33 cases of execution by cutting at the waist are mentioned, but occurs very rarely in earlier material.

Current use
Dismemberment is no longer used by most modern governments as a form of execution or torture, though amputation is still carried out in countries that practice Sharia law.

Tearing apart
Dismemberment was carried out in the Medieval and Early Modern era and could be effected, for example, by tying a person's limbs to chains or other restraints, then attaching the restraints to separate movable entities (e.g. vehicles) and moving them in opposite directions. Depending on the forces supplied by the horses or other entities, joints of the hips and shoulders were quickly dislocated, but ultimate severing of the tendons and ligaments in order to fully dismember the limbs would sometimes require assistance with cuts from a blade.

By four horses
Also referred to as "disruption" dismemberment could be brought about by chaining four horses to the condemned's arms and legs, thus making them pull him apart, as was the case with the executions of François Ravaillac in 1610, Michał Piekarski in 1620 and Robert-François Damiens in 1757. Ravaillac's extended torture and execution has been described like this:

In the case of Damiens, he was condemned to essentially the same fate as Ravaillac, but the execution did not quite work according to plan, as the eyewitness Giacomo Casanova could relate:

 

As late as in 1781, this gruesome punishment was meted out to the Peruvian rebel leader Túpac Amaru II by the Spanish colonial authorities. The following is an extract from the official judicial death sentence issued by the Spanish authorities which condemns Túpac Amaru II to torture and death. It was ordered in the sentence that Túpac Amaru II be condemned to have his tongue cut out, after watching the executions of his family, and to have his hands and feet tied

Fate of Queen Brunhilda

Queen Brunhilda of Austrasia, executed in 613, is generally regarded to have suffered the same death, though one account has it that she was tied to the tail of a single horse and thus suffered more of a dragging death. The Liber Historiae Francorum, an eighth century chronicle, describes her death by dismemberment as follows:

The story of Brunhilda being tied to the tail of a single horse (and then to die in some gruesome manner) is promoted, for example, by Ted Byfield (2003), in which he writes: "Then they tied her to the tail of a wild horse; whipped into frenzy, it kicked her to death". The cited source for this claim, however, the seventh century Life of St. Columban by the monk Jonas, does not support this claim. In paragraph 58 in his work, Jonas just writes: "but Brunhilda he had placed first on a camel in mockery and so exhibited to all her enemies round about then she was bound to the tails of wild horses and thus perished wretchedly".

The storyline of Brunhilde being tied to the tail of a single horse and being subsequently dragged to death has become a classical motif in artistic representations, as can be seen by the included image.

Torn apart by four ships
According to Olfert Dapper, a 17th-century Dutchman who meticulously collected reports from faraway countries from seamen and other travelers, a fairly frequent maritime death penalty among the Barbary corsairs was to affix the hands and feet to chains on four different ships. When the ships then sailed off in different directions, the chains grew taut, and the man in between was torn apart after a while.

Torn apart by two trees

Roman military discipline could be extremely severe, and the emperor Aurelian (r. AD 270–275), who had a reputation for extreme strictness, instituted the rule that soldiers who seduced the wives of their hosts should have their legs fastened to two bent-down trees, which were then released, ripping the man in two. Similarly, in an unsuccessful rebellion against the emperor Valens in AD 366, the usurper Procopius met the same fate.

After the defeat of Darius III by Alexander the Great, the Persian empire was thrown into turmoil, and Darius was killed. One man, Bessus, claimed the throne as Artaxerxes V, but in 329 BC, Alexander had him executed. The manner of Bessus' death is disputed, and Waldemar Heckel writes:

The method of tying people to bent down trees, which are then allowed to recoil, ripping the individual to pieces in the process is, however, mentioned by several travelers to nineteenth century Persia. The British diplomat James Justinian Morier travelled as a special envoy to the Shah in 1808, and Morier writes the following concerning then prevailing criminal justice:

Torn apart by stones
An obscure Christian martyr, Severianus was, about the year AD 300, martyred in the following way, according to one tale: One stone was fastened to his head, another bound to his feet. His middle was then fastened by a rope to the top of a wall, and the stones released from the height. His body was ripped apart.

A Christian martyr withstands being torn apart
During the reign of the Roman Emperor Diocletian a Christian named Shamuna withstood being torn apart in the following manner:

Some time thereafter, Shamuna was taken down from his hanging position, and was beheaded instead.

See also

Breaking wheel
Death by sawing
Decapitation
Hanged, drawn and quartered
Slow slicing
Total body disruption
Waist chop

References

Torture
Execution methods
Amputations